Lawrence Creek is a stream in Mason County, Kentucky, in the United States. It is a tributary of the Ohio River.

Lawrence Creek was named for Lawrence Darnall, a member of a company of explorers in the area in the 1770s.

See also
List of rivers of Kentucky

References

Rivers of Mason County, Kentucky
Rivers of Kentucky
Tributaries of the Ohio River